"High Maintenance" is a song by American pop singer Miranda Cosgrove from her second extended play of the same name in 2011. It features Rivers Cuomo from Weezer. The song was written by Cuomo, Josh Alexander and Billy Steinberg, and peaked on the Slovakia chart IFPI at number seventy-nine.

Background
In an interview with Billboard, Cosgrove revealed a duet with Rivers Cuomo, co-written by Cuomo, along with Josh Alexander and Billy Steinberg and produced by Cuomo.

Reception

Critical reception
Hiponline said of the song, "Title track “High Maintenance” sees Miranda trading tongue-in-cheek vocals about her carefree, fun-loving ways with Rivers Cuomo, who contributed as a songwriter and producer to the track.". Lauren Carter of The Boston Herald compared the sound to the likes of Avril Lavigne and Kesha and commented "High Maintenance is mostly high-octane fun, Cosgrove's all-grown-up soundtrack to letting loose and testing the rules without breaking them." Mikael Wood of Entertainment Weekly said the song is stronger than before. Allison Stewart of The Washington Post said that High Maintenance will sound familiar to anyone who heard her modestly received, similar-sounding 2010 full-length debut, Sparks Fly or any other teen pop disc released in the last five years."

Commercial performance
The song peaked on the Slovakia chart IFPI at number seventy-nine.

Charts

References

2011 singles
2011 songs
Miranda Cosgrove songs
Rivers Cuomo songs
Songs written by Billy Steinberg
Songs written by Josh Alexander
Songs written by Rivers Cuomo